The 1984–85 Phoenix Suns season was the 17th season for the Phoenix Suns of the National Basketball Association. The Suns were without All-Star Walter Davis for much of the season due to injury. They would be without him in the playoffs, extending a then-franchise record to eight consecutive seasons even though the Suns finished the regular season with the team's first losing record since the 1976–77 season. The Suns' playoff run would not last long, being swept in the first round of the Western Conference playoffs by the eventual league champions, the Los Angeles Lakers. The team was led by head coach John MacLeod, in his 12th year with the Suns, and played all home games in Arizona Veterans Memorial Coliseum.

Larry Nance would earn his first career All-Star selection, and led the Suns in scoring for the first time, averaging 20 points per game. He also tied with Maurice Lucas for team leader in rebounds, each averaging 8.8 on the season. Walter Davis was hampered by an injury, starting just nine games on the season and averaging only 15.0 points, while 7-footer James Edwards brought in 14.9 points per game.

Offseason

NBA Draft

Roster

Transactions

Free agents

Additions

Subtractions

References
 Standings on Basketball Reference

Phoenix Suns seasons
Ph